Jon Cedar (January 22, 1931 – April 14, 2011) was an American actor. He appeared in more than sixty television and film roles during his career.

Career
Cedar began his acting career in high school theater productions at Detroit High School. He enlisted in the U.S. military and served in Italy during the Korean War. Cedar moved to Hollywood after leaving the military. Cedar toured the United States with his family, appearing in traveling musical and touring off-Broadway productions. His stage credits during this time included the national tours of  South Pacific, Irma La Douce and The Deputy. He also joined the theatre troupe, the Players Ring, based in Hollywood, with his brother, George Cedar.

Cedar had a recurring role as the timid Corporal Karl Langenscheidt on the television series, Hogan's Heroes from 1965 to 1971.  (In 1967, in the episode "Two Nazi for the Price of One" his character was "Mannheim". and in 1971, in the episode "That's No Lady, That's My Spy" his character was "Oskar Danzig".)
 His other television roles included Matlock, Barnaby Jones, Kojak, Ben Casey, The Greatest American Hero, Moonlighting, The Rockford Files, Murder, She Wrote, Tales from the Darkside "Dream Girl" episode (1986) as Sid and the 1987 film In Love and War. His last television appearance was in an episode of The Inside in 2005.

Cedar was a co-star, co-screenwriter and associate producer on the 1978 horror film The Manitou, which starred Tony Curtis. His additional film credits included Little Cigars (1973), The Execution of Private Slovik (1974), Foxy Brown (1974), Day of the Animals (1977), Capricorn One (1978), The Concorde ... Airport '79 (1979), Death Hunt (1981), Kiss Daddy Goodbye (1981), and Messenger of Death (1988). His last film role was in the 1997 film Murder in Mind.

Personal life and death
He and his late wife, Barbara Cedar, owned and operated a script typing company, Barbara's Place, during the 1970s and 1980s. In the 1990s he coached actors at Theater Theater in Hollywood, California, including Chris Aable who introduced him to fellow actors who also became students of Cedar, Gedde Watanabe and Steve Burton.

Jon Cedar died of leukemia at Providence Tarzana Medical Center in Los Angeles on April 14, 2011, at the age of 80. He was predeceased by his wife, Barbara. Cedar was survived by his daughter, actress Loren Thompson; son, producer Michael Cedar; companion, Elynore Leigh; brother, actor George Cedar; and Larry Cedar. His memorial service was held at the Groman Eden Mortuary in Mission Hills, California.

Cedar adhered to Judaism.

Filmography

References

External links
 
 

1931 births
2011 deaths
American male television actors
American male film actors
American male stage actors
American male screenwriters
Deaths from cancer in California
Deaths from leukemia
20th-century American male actors
Jewish American male actors
Jewish American writers
21st-century American Jews
Burials at Eden Memorial Park Cemetery